The Black Renaissance in D.C. was a social, intellectual, and cultural movement in Washington, D.C. that began in 1919 and continued into the late 1920s.

Background
Before the start of the Harlem Renaissance, Washington, D.C. developed an educated and prosperous Black middle class, made up of Black intellectuals and scholars who often studied at Howard University. Washington, D.C. had the country's largest Black community from 1900 to 1920, heavily influencing the development of the Black Renaissance in the area.

While the Black Renaissance movement ultimately began in Harlem, Manhattan, New York, with the Harlem Renaissance, the movement ultimately spread to cities across the United States. In Washington, D.C., the movement began on July 19, 1919, with the alleged sexual assault of a white woman by a black predator. The event was never confirmed, but it incited inflammatory responses from the four daily newspapers in the city. Several hundred whites formed a mob near Murder Bay off of Pennsylvania Avenue, a neighborhood known for prostitution and violence. The mob went on to assault a Black couple who were walking on 9th and D Streets, Southwest. Many prominent figures in the Harlem movement had strong roots in Washington, D.C. and heavily influenced the movement there.

Development

Music
U Street and Shaw was known as a place of entertainment and jazz music during this era. As a result of its cultural importance, U street was often referred to as "Black Broadway".

Characteristics and themes

Important figures

See also
African-American art
African-American culture
African-American literature
Black Arts Movement
Blackbirds of 1928
Chicago Black Renaissance
Encyclopedia of the Harlem Renaissance (book)
Harlem Renaissance
List of African-American visual artists
List of female entertainers of the Harlem Renaissance
List of figures from the Harlem Renaissance
New Negro
The New Negro: The Life of Alain Locke
Niggerati
Roaring Twenties
Shuffle Along
William E. Harmon Foundation award

References

African-American history of Washington, D.C.
American literary movements
African-American literature
1920s in the United States
20th-century American literature